The 2016 Pocono Mountains 150 was the 12th stock car race of the 2016 NASCAR Camping World Truck Series, and the 7th iteration of the event. The race was held on Saturday, July 30, 2016, in Long Pond, Pennsylvania, at Pocono Raceway, a 1.5-mile (2.4 km) permanent triangle-shaped racetrack. The race took the scheduled 60 laps to complete. William Byron, driving for Kyle Busch Motorsports, held off the field on the final restart with 4 laps to go, and earned his fifth career NASCAR Camping World Truck Series win, breaking the record for the most wins in a single truck series season by a rookie. Byron also dominated the race, leading 44 of the 60 laps.  To fill out the podium, Cameron Hayley, driving for ThorSport Racing, and Brett Moffitt, driving for Red Horse Racing, would finish 2nd and 3rd, respectively.

Background 

Pocono Raceway (formerly Pocono International Raceway), also known as The Tricky Triangle, is a superspeedway located in the Pocono Mountains in Long Pond, Pennsylvania. It is the site of three NASCAR national series races and an ARCA Menards Series event in July: a NASCAR Cup Series race with support events by the NASCAR Xfinity Series and NASCAR Camping World Truck Series. From 1971 to 1989, and from 2013 to 2019, the track also hosted an Indy Car race, currently sanctioned by the IndyCar Series. Additionally, from 1982 to 2021, it hosted two NASCAR Cup Series races, with the traditional first date being removed for 2022.

Pocono is one of the few NASCAR tracks not owned by either NASCAR or Speedway Motorsports, the dominant track owners in NASCAR. Pocono CEO Nick Igdalsky and president Ben May are members of the family-owned Mattco Inc, started by Joseph II and Rose Mattioli.  Mattco also owns South Boston Speedway in South Boston, Virginia.

Entry list 

 (R) denotes rookie driver.
 (i) denotes driver who is ineligible for series driver points.

Practice

First practice 
The first practice session was held on Friday, July 29, at 12:30 pm EST, and would last for 1 hour and 25 minutes.

Final practice 
The final practice session was held on Friday, July 29, at 3:00 pm EST, and would last for 55 minutes.

Qualifying 
Qualifying was originally going to be held on Saturday, July 30, at 9:15 am EST. Since Pocono Raceway is at least 1.5 miles (2.4 km) in length, the qualifying system was a single car, single lap, two round system where in the first round, everyone would set a time to determine positions 13–32. Then, the fastest 12 qualifiers would move on to the second round to determine positions 1–12.

Qualifying was cancelled due to inclement weather. The starting lineup would be determined by practice speeds. As a result, William Byron, driving for Kyle Busch Motorsports, would earn the pole for the race.

Starting lineup

Race results

Standings after the race 

Drivers' Championship standings

Note: Only the first 8 positions are included for the driver standings.

References 

NASCAR races at Pocono Raceway
July 2016 sports events in the United States
2016 in sports in Pennsylvania